Tazeh Kand-e Hasel-e Qubi (also Romanized as Tāzeh Kand-e Ḩāşel-e Qūbī; also known as Tāzeh Kand-e Ḩāşel-e Qūbī-ye Afshār and Tāzeh Kand-e Ḩāşel Qū'ī) is a village in Marhemetabad Rural District, in the Central District of Miandoab County, West Azerbaijan Province, Iran. At the 2006 census, its population was 132, in 36 families.

References 

Populated places in Miandoab County